Brandon Foster (born December 25, 1984) is a former American football cornerback. He most recently attended training camp with the Saskatchewan Roughriders. He was signed by the Colts as an undrafted free agent in 2008 after posting a 4.28 40 time at the University of Texas Pro Day. He played college football at Texas.

Early years
Foster attended Bowie High School in Arlington, Texas and was a two-year starter. He was also and all-district selection as a senior with 42 tackles, 4 interceptions and two forced fumbles. He also was a 2003 state track champion as a member of the 4x100 and 4x200 relay team. The 4x100 meter recorded a time of 40.06 which was the 3rd fastest time in nation at the time.

College career
Foster played 8 games as a redshirt freshman in 2004 and had two tackles. As a sophomore, he had  16 tackles in the 10th ranked defense. In 2006, he had 15 tackles and 4 interception in which he returned 2 for touchdown which tied as a UT record all in his first year as a starter. In 2007, he was named All-Big 12 Second-team with 4 interceptions. In all his four years, he had 106 tackles and 4 interceptions.

Professional career

Indianapolis Colts
Foster was signed as a rookie free agent on May 2, 2008. He was released by the team during final cuts and re-signed to the practice squad on September 1. The Colts promoted him to the active roster on November 19 when cornerback Nick Graham was placed on injured reserve. Foster was waived on December 2 and re-signed to the practice squad a day later.

After finishing the season on the practice squad, Foster was re-signed to a future contract on January 5, 2009. He was waived on July 29, 2009.

Saskatchewan Roughriders
On March 24, 2010, Foster signed with the Saskatchewan Roughriders of the Canadian Football League.

Coaching career

Former District Athletic Coordinator at Advantage Academy. Varsity football, basketball and track coach.

References

External links
Indianapolis Colts bio

1984 births
Living people
People from Dallas
American football cornerbacks
American football safeties
Texas Longhorns football players
Indianapolis Colts players
Saskatchewan Roughriders players